Angaara is a 1996 Indian Hindi-language action film directed by Anil Ganguly, and starring Mithun Chakraborty and Rupali Ganguly , and music was by duo, Dilip Sen and Sameer Sen. It did not do well at the box office.

Plot

Sagar  lives with his mother, younger brother and a younger sister. He has never met his father, who had abandoned his mother. Sagar is a thief, a secret not known to anyone else including his family. He uses different disguises to steal from Dhaniram Koilewala  and Pascal . Dhaniram and Pascal go to Honda Dada  for help. Honda decides to help them. Meanwhile, Sagar comes across a man, Om Prakash who would help him to find his father. Sagar soon finds out that Om has a different plan. Honda and his men too find out who Sagar is and thus Sagar's and his family's life is at risk. How would he save himself and his family from them is the real question.

Cast
 Mithun Chakraborty - Sagar
 Kamal Sadanah - Vishal
 Simran - Pooja Pascal
 Sadashiv Amrapurkar - Police Inspector
 Rupali Ganguly - Gulabi
 Suresh Bhagwat - Gulabi's maternal uncle
 Hemant Birje - Chotu
 Suresh Chatwal - Gulabi's maternal uncle
 Sudhir Dalvi - Sagar's dad
 Tarun Ghosh - Vidyacharan
 Farida Jalal- Saraswati
 Mohan Joshi - Om Prakash
 Rami Reddy - Honda Dada
Goga Kapoor - Pascal
Harish Patel - Dhaniram Koilewala

Music
"Dheere Dheere Bolna" - Mohammed Aziz, Kavita Krishnamurthy
"Gore Gore Gal Wali" - Sadhana Sargam, Udit Narayan
"Aara Hile Chhapra Hile" - Udit Narayan, Alka Yagnik
"Tun Tuna Tun Tuna" - Abhijeet, Poornima
"Jeevan Hai Sangram Bande" - Kumar Sanu
"Aaja Gori Banki Chhori" - Kavita Krishnamurthy, Kumar Sanu

References

External links
 
 

1996 films
1990s Hindi-language films
Mithun's Dream Factory films
Films shot in Ooty
Films scored by Dilip Sen-Sameer Sen
Films directed by Anil Ganguly
Indian action films